Bietigheim-Bissingen (locally: Biedge-Bissenge) is the second-largest town in the district of Ludwigsburg, Baden-Württemberg, Germany with 42,515 inhabitants in 2007. It is situated on the river Enz and the river Metter, close to its confluence with the Neckar, about 19 km north of Stuttgart, and 20 km south of Heilbronn.

History

Towards the end of the 18th century Bietigheim saw during the beginning of the industrialisation an improvement of the living conditions and an increase in population. The 1806 furnished Oberamt Bietigheim was in 1810, however, dissolved again: the city and its official municipalities were integrated in the Oberamt Besigheim. After Bietigheim was connected mid-19th century  to the railway network and the city experienced a real breakthrough and a sustained recovery. At the end of the 19th century there were 3,800 inhabitants. In 1938, Bietigheim came to the new Ludwigsburg (district).
A branch of the Nazi Party was in Bietigheim since 1928. Until 1933, this was with 51 members relatively small. After the Nazi seizure of power  there were 181 new entrants. By the end of the Nazi regime finally were 939 party members in Bietigheim, representing 10.4 percent of the total population in 1945.

Buildings and sights 

 287 m long Bietigheim Enz Valley Bridge (German: "Bietigheimer Enzviadukt") (built in 1853)
 Old gate (only one still present, built in the 14th century)
 (Protestant) church in Downtown Bietigheim (built in 1401)
 Kilian church in Bissingen (built from 1517)
 Wine Press (now a building for public events)
 Town hall (built in 1506)
 "Hornmoldhaus" (built in 1536)
 Castle of Bietigheim (built in 1546, renovated between 2000 and 2002), nowadays home to the Bietigheim-Bissingen music school

Infrastructure 
Bietigheim-Bissingen station is located on an important railway junction on the Western Railway (connecting Stuttgart with Karlsruhe and Heidelberg) and the Franconia Railway to Heilbronn.  Line 5 of the Stuttgart S-Bahn and line 5 of the Stadtbahn Karlsruhe both start here.

Notable people

Sons and daughters of the town

 Erwin Bälz (1849–1913), personal physician of the Imperial House of Japan and co-founder of modern medicine in Japan
 Elisabeth Goes (1911–2007), pastor's wife and Righteous Among the Nations
 Kurt Hager (1912–1998), member of the Politbüro of the SED in GDR
 Gebhard Fürst (born 1948), bishop of Rottenburg-Stuttgart and a member of the National Ethics Council
 Michael Jacobi (born 1960), member of Parliament from 1988 to 1991
 Heiko Maile, Marcus Meyn and Oliver Kreyssig, members of the German pop group Camouflage
 Matthias Ettrich (born 1972), founder of KDE
 Roland Bless (born 1961), and Ingo Reidl (born 1961), members of the German pop group Pur
 Stefan Hofmann (born 1964), an author, psychologist, and professor at Boston University
 Namosh (born 1981), a German musician and singer
 Bernd Leno (born 1992), a football goalkeeper
 Shindy (born 1988), a German Rap artist
 Alexander Wehrle (born 1975), sports administrator

People who lived there
 Ottmar Mergenthaler (1854–1899), inventor of the Linotype typesetting machine, spent four years in Bietigheim during his apprenticeship to a watchmaker
 Bernd Leno (born 1992), football goalkeeper for Bayer 04 Leverkusen, Arsenal FC, and the Germany national football team

Events 
 Bietigheim Horse Market
 Music Exchange with Shawnee Mission South High School symphonic band every 4 years
 Music Exchange with Shawnee Mission South High School string orchestra every 4 years
 Music Exchange with Community High School District 99 Honors Band and Orchestra (Downers Grove, IL) every 2 years.

Business and industry 
 Elbe & Sohn

Twin towns – sister cities

Bietigheim-Bissingen is twinned with:
 Kusatsu, Japan (1962)
 Sucy-en-Brie, France (1967)
 Surrey Heath, England, United Kingdom (1971)
 Szekszárd, Hungary (1989)
 Overland Park, United States (1999)

References

External links

 Official website

Ludwigsburg (district)
Württemberg